Keithley is a surname. Notable people with the surname include:

Gary Keithley (born 1951), American football player
Joe Keithley (born 1956), Canadian punk musician 
June Keithley (1947–2013), Filipina actress and broadcast journalist